Valeri Pokrovsky (born 17 May 1978) is a Russian professional ice hockey defenceman who currently plays for Amur Khabarovsk of the Kontinental Hockey League (KHL).

References

External links

1978 births
Living people
Amur Khabarovsk players
HC Spartak Moscow players
Russian ice hockey defencemen
Sportspeople from Yekaterinburg